Agrostis densiflora is a species of grass known by the common name California bent grass. It is endemic to the coast of northern and central California, United States, where it grows in habitat along the immediate coastline, such as dunes and bluffs.

Description

References

External links
 University of California, Berkeley—Jepson Manual Treatment
 US Department of Agriculture—Plants Profile
 CalPhotos—Photo gallery

densiflora
Native grasses of California
Endemic flora of California